Ibrahim Sanjaya (born 26 August 1997) is an Indonesian professional footballer who plays as a full-back for Liga 1 club PSS Sleman.

Club career

Semen Padang
In 2017, Ibrahim Sanjaya signed a contract with Indonesian Liga 1 club Semen Padang. He made his league debut on 21 September 2017 in a match against Persiba Balikpapan at the Batakan Stadium, Balikpapan.

Persik Kediri
He was signed for Persik Kediri to play in Liga 2 in the 2019 season. On 25 November 2019 Persik won the 2019 Liga 2 Final and promoted to Liga 1, after defeated Persita Tangerang 3–2 at the Kapten I Wayan Dipta Stadium, Gianyar.

PSS Sleman
Sanjaya was signed for PSS Sleman to play in Liga 1 in the 2022–23 season. He made his league debut on 23 August 2022 in a match against Persik Kediri at the Brawijaya Stadium, Kediri.

International career
In 2016, Sanjaya represented the Indonesia U-19, in the 2016 AFF U-19 Youth Championship.

Career statistics

Club

Honours

Club
Semen Padang
 Liga 2 runner-up: 2018
Persik Kediri
 Liga 2: 2019

References

External links
 Ibrahim Sanjaya at Soccerway
 Ibrahim Sanjaya at Liga Indonesia

1997 births
Living people
Indonesian footballers
Liga 1 (Indonesia) players
Liga 2 (Indonesia) players
Semen Padang F.C. players
Persik Kediri players
PSS Sleman players
Association football fullbacks
Indonesia youth international footballers
Sportspeople from East Nusa Tenggara